The Hawker Hunter Tower Bridge incident occurred on 5 April 1968, when Royal Air Force (RAF) Hawker Hunter pilot Alan Pollock performed unauthorised low flying over several London landmarks and then flew through the span of Tower Bridge on the River Thames. His actions were to mark the 50th anniversary of the founding of the RAF and as a demonstration against the Ministry of Defence for not recognising it.

Upon landing Pollock was arrested and later invalided out of the RAF on medical grounds, which avoided a court martial.

Background
In the 1960s, the Ministry of Defence saw a shifting emphasis from manned aircraft towards guided missiles, originating from the 1957 Defence White Paper by then-Minister of Defence Duncan Sandys. The British aircraft industry had slipped into general decline, and morale in the Royal Air Force (RAF) was low. Flight Lieutenant Alan Pollock, a flight commander in No. 1 (Fighter) Squadron RAF, was further displeased that no aerial displays had been planned to mark the RAF's 50th anniversary.

On 1 April 1968, Pollock and other members of No. 1 Squadron took part in anniversary leaflet raids on other RAF stations and on 4 April visited the soon-to-be-closed RAF Tangmere in West Sussex, where they performed a display.

Incident

On 5 April 1968, Pollock decided on his own initiative to mark the occasion of the RAF anniversary with an unauthorised display. His flight left RAF Tangmere to return to RAF West Raynham in Norfolk, a route that took them over London. Immediately after takeoff, Pollock left the flight and flew low level. Having "beaten up" Dunsfold Aerodrome (Hawker's home airfield), he then took his Hawker Hunter FGA.9 (XF442), a single-seater, ground-attack jet fighter, over London at low level, and circled the Houses of Parliament three times as a demonstration against Prime Minister Harold Wilson's government, whose defence cuts had impacted the RAF. Pollock continued and dipped his wings over the Royal Air Force Memorial on the Embankment, and finally flew under the top span of Tower Bridge. He later wrote of the decision to fly through Tower Bridge:

Knowing that he was likely to be stripped of his flying status as a result of this display, he proceeded to "beat up" several airfields (Wattisham, Lakenheath and Marham) in inverted flight at an altitude of about  en route to his base at RAF West Raynham, where, within the hour, he was formally arrested by Flying Officer Roger Gilpin.

Although other pilots had flown under the upper span of Tower Bridge, Pollock was the first to do so in a jet aircraft.

Aftermath
In the immediate aftermath of the incident, Pollock's unit was posted to North Africa without him while he remained on a charge. He was subsequently invalided out of the RAF on medical grounds. This avoided a court martial and the embarrassment to the government of Pollock publicising the reason for his stunt and perhaps receiving the support of the public.

The RAF placed Pollock in a "psychiatric hold" for two days. Demonstrations of support for his conduct was expressed by British Overseas Airways Corporation (BOAC), which sent him a keg of beer, and six members of the House of Commons spoke on Pollock's behalf in Parliament.

Notes

Footnotes

See also
 1974 White House helicopter incident

References
 McLelland, Tim. "The Hawker Hunter". Manchester, UK: Crécy Publishing Ltd., 2008 (Chapter 9, Fond memories, account by Alan Pollock),

External links
 
 The Hawker Hunter History page with a brief description of the Pollock incident

History of the Royal Air Force
1968 in London
1960s crimes in London
History of the River Thames
20th century in the London Borough of Tower Hamlets
20th century in the London Borough of Southwark
Aviation accidents and incidents in London
Accidents and incidents involving Royal Air Force aircraft
Aviation accidents and incidents in 1968
1968 in aviation
1968 in military history
20th-century history of the Royal Air Force
April 1968 events in the United Kingdom